Perloz is a town and comune in the Aosta Valley region of northwestern Italy. The population  from the 2011 census was at 453.

References

External links 
 
 Perloz, Italy

Cities and towns in Aosta Valley